Kryštof Daněk is a Czech professional footballer playimg as a  midfielder who currently plays for AC Sparta Prague in the Czech First League, and the Czech Republic national under-21 football team.

Early life
Daněk started playing football for local club SK Chalkovice at the age of six. In 2015 he moved to SK Sigma Olomouc academy.

Club career

Sigma Olomouc
Danek made his professional debut for Sigma Olomouc in a 3-1 Czech Cup win over FK Jablonec in March 2020. In the rest of that season Danek made 3 other appearances in the league.

In the 2020-21 season Danek played a more central role for Sigma Olomouc, scoring his forst goal for the club in a 4–1 home win against SFC Opava. In total in the 2020–21 season Danek scored 3 goals in 26 appearances in all competitions. The next season Danek scored 3 goals in 32 games in all competitions.

Sparta Prague
In June 2022 Danek transferred to fellow Czech First League club AC Sparta Prague on a multi-year deal. 
Danek made his debut for Sparta in a 2–1 home defeat to FC Slovan Liberec. He also scored his first goal
in that game. His second goal for the club came in a 1–1 draw at home to FK Jablonec.

International career
Danek has represented Czech Republic at U16, U17 and U21 level.

References

External links
 

Czech footballers
Czech Republic under-21 international footballers
2003 births
Living people
Czech First League players
SK Sigma Olomouc players
Association football midfielders
AC Sparta Prague players
Czech National Football League players